James Patrick Dorrian (born March 6, 1931 in Queens, New York) was a U.S. soccer player who was a member of the U.S. soccer team at the 1956 Summer Olympics. At the time of the tournament, he played for Danish F.C. in the National Soccer League of New York.

References

External links 
  (misspelled last name)
  (misspelled last name)

1931 births
Living people
American soccer players
Olympic soccer players of the United States
Footballers at the 1956 Summer Olympics
National Soccer League of New York players
Sportspeople from Queens, New York
Soccer players from New York City
Association football midfielders